Narsapur Express Train.No.17255/17256 Narasapur-Hyderabad is a Daily Train. Narsapur Express is one of the busiest trains, running with 23 coaches at full capacity at all times. It has 19 halts and 79 intermediate Stations between Hyderabad Deccan Nampally and Narasapur. Narsapur Express is considered to be one of the most prestigious trains of South Central Railway(SCR) which connects the Telangana state capital city of Hyderabad with the Narasapuram town of Andhra Pradesh and is operated with 17255/17256 as train numbers. The train is considered the best way between the two cities and coaches is maintained very neatly by the South Central Railway.

The train departs from Hyderabad at 21:45 hours and arrives in Narasapuram at 08:40 hours the next day. From Narasapuram, train departs at 18:55 hours and arrives in Hyderabad at 05:25 hours the next day. Train run with 6 air-conditioned coaches. The train operates daily and covers a distance of 461 km, via Gudivada, Vijayawada, Guntur, Nalgonda. This train is full entire year still South Central Railway (SCR) didn't provide more trains in this route. The Rake is shared by Narasapur–Nagarsol Express

Loco
 It is regularly hauled by WAP-4/WAP-7 Hyderabad to Narasapur

Coach composition
A rake of the Narasapur Express consists of 23 Coaches. It has one 1AC/2AC combo, 2 AC 2-Tier Coach, 3 AC 3-Tier Coaches, 13 Sleeper Class Coaches, 2 General Compartments and 2SLR's.

ENGINE(20054 WDP-4 DIESEL)-SLR-GS-S1 to S7- S8 to S13-B3-B2-B1-A1-A2-H1-GS-SLR

Stations Covers
 Hyderabad Deccan (0 km)
 Secunderabad Junction (10 km)
 Bibinagar (43 km)
 Nalgonda (120 km)
 Miryalaguda (158 km)
 Vishnupuram (178 km)
 Nadikude Junction (196 km)
 Piduguralla (217 km)
 Sattenapalle (249 km)
 Guntur Junction (291 km)
 Mangalagiri (311 km)
 Vijayawada Junction (323 km)
 Gudivada Junction (367 km)
 Mandavalli (389 km)
 Kaikaluru (396 km)
 Akividu (413 km)
 Bhimavaram Town (430 km)
 Bhimavaram Junction (432 km)
 Veeravasaram (442 km)
 Palakollu (452 km)
 Narasapuram (461 km)

See also
 Indian locomotives

References
 Indian Railways Reservation Enquiry

External links
 IRCTC Online Passenger Reservation System

Transport in Hyderabad, India
Named passenger trains of India
Rail transport in Andhra Pradesh
Rail transport in Telangana
Express trains in India